Mizan al-Itidal or Mizan al-I'tidal fi Naqd ar-Rijal is one of the most important works of Ilm al-Rijal (Science of Narrators or Biographical evaluation) written by Imam al-Dhahabi (d.748 AH) in the 8th century of Islamic History.

Description
Mizan al-Itidal is the rework of an Imam Ibn 'Adi al-Jurjani's (d. 277 H) book by the name of al-Kamil fi Dhu'afa' al-Rijal. Imam al-Dhahabi has since extended it, refined it and called it Mizan al-Itidal. It is one of the most famous booksin the field of Ilm al-Rijal (Science of Narrators or Biographical evaluation), and is published in five volumes that contain more than 3000 pages. The book is in alphabetical order in which the author identified liar narrarators, unknown narrarators, and those narrators who are to be abandoned. He also distinguishes weak narrators from scholars in hadith whose degree is low due to memory or certain other breaches. He also took care to avoid some misleading statements that may exist in some Hadith Scholars (Muhaddiths) and which are ambiguous on the weakness of the narrator..

Publications
The book has been published by many organizations around the world: 
    Mizan al-I'tidal fi Naqd al-Rijal 5 VOLUMES (مِيزَانُ الإِعْتِدَال فِي نَقْدِ الرِّجَال) by Imam Shams al-Din al-Dhahabi: Published: al-Risalah al-'Alamiyyah  | Beirut, Lebanon
   Mizan al-I'tidal fi Naqd ar-Rijal - Dhahabi ('Ilm Jarh wa Ta'dil): Published:مؤسسة الرسالة
   Mizan al-I'tidal fi Naqd al-Rijal - Dhahabi : Published: Al-Resalah, 2017

See also
 List of Sunni books
 Kutub al-Sittah

References

9th-century Arabic books
10th-century Arabic books
Sunni literature
Hadith
Hadith collections
Sunni hadith collections